Savino Selo, formerly Torschau / Torszà / Torša, is a village in Serbia. It is situated in the municipality of Vrbas, in the South Bačka District, Vojvodina province.

History

A settlement named Torsza was first mentioned in 1486. After the Turkish wars had ended by the late 17th century, the Bačka was widely deserted. During the reign of Emperor Josef II it was being repopulated by mostly Rhinehessian families, called Švabo (Danube Swabians) by their Serbian and Slovak neighbours. The village of Torschau (Hungarian Torszà, Serbian Torža) was built in 1784 by these German Protestant settlers, the first of seven newly founded German villages in the Batschka. 20 other German villages were restored and resettled. Over the years the village became ethnically mixed; until 1944 with a mainly German plus Serbian, Slovak and Hungarian population. In 1934 a monument was erected in remembrance of the village's 150 year long history. The Reformed Protestant church has recently been reconstructed and rededicated as Serbian Orthodox.

Savino Selo literally means "Sava's Village", and is today named after the legendary Montenegrin Partisan commander and war hero Sava Kovačević. During the last days of WWII, Torschau's German population fled in front of approaching Red Army units, mainly to Hungary, Austria and Germany. In 1945, colonisation of people from Bosnia and Montenegro (especially Vasojević clan) formed the current ethnic structure of the village.

Ethnic groups today

According to the 2002 census, ethnic groups in the village include:
 1,280 (38.20%) Montenegrins
 1,211 (36.14%) Serbs
 166 (4.95%) Slovaks
 161 (4.81%) Hungarians
 106 (3.16%) Croats
 others.

Population after WWII

1961: 5,144
1971: 4,044
1981: 3,749
1991: 3,767

See also
List of places in Serbia
List of cities, towns and villages in Vojvodina

References

Slobodan Ćurčić, Broj stanovnika Vojvodine, Novi Sad, 1996.
 :de:Donauschwaben
 Danube Swabians
http://www.swabiantrek.com/?page_id=504

Gallery

Places in Bačka
South Bačka District
Montenegrin communities